Ali Hossain (23 March 1940 – 17 February 2021) was a Bangladeshi music composer.  He was notable for the songs like "Osru Diye Lekha E Gaan", and "Holud Bato Mendi Bato". He has composed music for 42 films in his career. He won Bangladesh National Film Award for Best Music Director for his music direction in the 1989 film Byathar Daan. He was honored at 12th Channel-i Music Awards (2017) for his contribution to Bangladeshi music.

Early life and career
Hossain was born in Comilla in the then Bengal Presidency, British India.

Hossain got his breakthrough by composing the song "Osru Diye Lekha A Gaan", sung by Sabina Yasmin in the 1972 film Osru Diye Lekha.

Notable songs
Hossain's notable music compositions include:
 ”Koto je tomake beshechi bhalo”
 "Chaturi Jane na Mor Bodhua"
 "Arey O Praner Raja Tumi Je Amar"
 "E Akash K Shakkhi Rekhe E Batash K Shakkhi Rekhe"
 "O Duti Noyone Shopone Choyone Nijere Je Bhule Jay Tulona Khuje Na Pay"
 "Kehoi Kore Bechakena" 
 "Ke Tumi Ele Go Amar E Jibone"

Hossain composed Urdi songs for the films "Chhote Saheb", "Daag", "Anari", "Coolie", and others.

Hossain died on 17 February 2021 at a hospital in Boston, United States.

Filmography 

 Juari
 Tiger
 Shilpi
 Sneho
 Kaliya
 Mayer Ashirbad
 Rajar Meye Bedeni
 Mayer Doa
 Apon Ghar
 Byathar Daan
 Altabanu
 Chandralekha 
 Bijoyini Sonavan
 Angaar
 Badshah
 Osru Diye Lekha
 Chowdhury Bari
 Ekee Onge Eto Rup
 Anari (as Ali Hussain)
 Daagh (as Ali Hussain)
 Chotey Sahab
 Kuli (as Ali Hussain)
 Daak Bangla
 Daak Babu
 Mala (bangla version)

discography

References

External links
 

1940 births
2021 deaths
People from Comilla
Bangladeshi composers
20th-century Bangladeshi male singers
20th-century Bangladeshi singers